Marilyn "Lin" Arison is the co-founder of the National YoungArts Foundation and the New World Symphony. She is the widow of Ted Arison, founder of Carnival Cruise Lines, and a real estate investor in Florida. 

Arison is an arts education advocate and a philanthropist. In 2007, she published a book about Van Gogh and impressionism, featuring her personal travel memoir alongside photographs by Neil Folberg.

Arison was awarded the National Medal of Arts by President Barack Obama at the White House on July 10, 2013.

Works

References 

Living people
American patrons of the arts
American women non-fiction writers
United States National Medal of Arts recipients
Year of birth missing (living people)